United Front or the Seven Party Alliance (Malayalam: Saptha Kakshi Munnani) was an alliance of seven political parties in Kerala state, India, which won the 1967 Kerala Legislative Assembly election and formed the Second E. M. S. Namboodiripad ministry. It was led by the Communist Party of India Marxist (CPIM) and the members of the coalition were:

The coalition had a comfortable majority of 117 members out of 133 (including 4 independents). E. M. S. Namboodiripad (CPIM) was sworn in as the Chief Minister for the second time on 6 March 1967. But before completing 30 months, internal dissensions surfaced and the government fell 32 months after assuming power, on 24 October 1969.

Second Namboodiripad ministry

See also
 United Front (1970–1979, Kerala)

References

Defunct political party alliances in India